Vitosha Saddle (Vitoshka Sedlovina \'vi-tosh-ka se-dlo-vi-'na\) is a narrow ice-covered saddle of elevation 1050 m extending in southwest–northeast direction between Great Needle Peak (Falsa Aguja Peak) and Vihren Peak in the Levski Ridge of Tangra Mountains, eastern Livingston Island in the South Shetland Islands, Antarctica. The saddle is part of the divide between the glacial catchments of Huron Glacier to the north and Magura Glacier to the south.

The feature is named after Vitosha Mountain, Bulgaria.

Location

Maps
 South Shetland Islands. Scale 1:200000 topographic map. DOS 610 Sheet W 62 60. Tolworth, UK, 1968.
 L.L. Ivanov et al. Antarctica: Livingston Island and Greenwich Island, South Shetland Islands. Scale 1:100000 topographic map. Sofia: Antarctic Place-names Commission of Bulgaria, 2005.
 L.L. Ivanov. Antarctica: Livingston Island and Greenwich, Robert, Snow and Smith Islands. Scale 1:120000 topographic map.  Troyan: Manfred Wörner Foundation, 2009.  
 Antarctic Digital Database (ADD). Scale 1:250000 topographic map of Antarctica. Scientific Committee on Antarctic Research (SCAR). Since 1993, regularly updated.
 L.L. Ivanov. Antarctica: Livingston Island and Smith Island. Scale 1:100000 topographic map. Manfred Wörner Foundation, 2017.

References
 Vitosha Saddle. SCAR Composite Antarctic Gazetteer
 Bulgarian Antarctic Gazetteer. Antarctic Place-names Commission. (details in Bulgarian, basic data in English)

External links
 Vitosha Saddle. Copernix satellite image

Tangra Mountains